Rank comparison chart of all air forces of Post-Soviet states.

Officers (OF 1–10)

References

See also
Comparative air force officer ranks of Asia
Comparative air force officer ranks of Europe

Military comparisons